Ivana Loudová (8 March 1941 – 25 July 2017) was a Czech composer.  

Loudová was born at Chlumec nad Cidlinou. She studied at the Prague Conservatory and the Academy of Music and Dramatic Arts under Miloslav Kabeláč and Emil Hlobil. She later studied in Paris at the Centre Bourdan under Olivier Messiaen and Andre Jolivet.
She has written orchestral and chamber music, as well as music for the voice and film/stage. She obtained an honourable mention in Mannheim for the composition Rhapsody in Black, and won at the Guido d'Arezzo” International Polyphonic Competition in Italy in 1978, 1980 and 1984.  In the choral area, she wrote the Vocal Symphony in 1965 and later wrote children's choral works such as the prize-winning Little Christmas Cantata.  She has also written music for American Wind Symphony Orchestra and other orchestral works.
Since 1992 Ivana Loudová has taught composition on the Academy of Music and Dramatic Arts in Prague.
For her work Ivana Loudová received the award Heidelberger Kunstpreis 1993, the award of the Ministry of culture for a contribution to the music world for the year 2015 and the award of the Protective Association 2017. 

Ivana Loudová died in Prague on 25 July 2017 after a long and perilous disease. She was 76 years old.

References

External links
 Official site 
 Choral Music in the Twentieth Century, Nick Strimple (2005) 
The Harvard Dictionary of Music (2003) Don Michael Randel, p. 233 
The American Wind Band: A Cultural History (2005) Richard K. Hansen
The Norton/Grove Dictionary of Women Composers (1995) By Julie Anne Sadie, Rhian Samuel
Ivana Loudová 

1941 births
2017 deaths
Czech classical composers
Women classical composers
Czech women
Prague Conservatory alumni
People from Chlumec nad Cidlinou